Julián López de Lerma Barahona (born 27 February 1987) is a Spanish retired footballer who played as a midfielder.

Club career
López was born in Badajoz, Extremadura. After graduating from RCD Espanyol's youth system, he made his first-team debut in 2006–07, playing seven La Liga matches mostly always as a late substitute (he was initially summoned for the 2007 UEFA Cup Final against Sevilla FC, but eventually did not make the final list of 18). For the following season he was loaned to Sevilla Atlético in the second division, appearing rarely due to a severe injury.

In January 2009, after having made no competitive appearances for the Catalans during the first half of the campaign, López served another loan, now with Greek side Panthrakikos FC, and again suffered a serious physical setback, fracturing his right leg. After returning to the RCDE Stadium, whilst training with the reserves, he suffered another severe injury.

On 3 March 2011, after a failed move to CF Gavà, López terminated his contract and signed with amateurs UE Rubí. In late July, at only 24, he retired from football due to his constant problems with injuries.

López returned to his main club Espanyol in early November 2011, being appointed scout in its academy.

References

External links

1987 births
Living people
Sportspeople from Badajoz
Spanish footballers
Footballers from Extremadura
Association football midfielders
La Liga players
Segunda División players
Segunda División B players
Tercera División players
RCD Espanyol B footballers
RCD Espanyol footballers
Sevilla Atlético players
UE Rubí players
Super League Greece players
Panthrakikos F.C. players
Spanish expatriate footballers
Expatriate footballers in Greece
Spanish expatriate sportspeople in Greece